Events in the year 1984 in Greece.

Incumbents

Births

 4 April – Katerina Khristoforidou, artistic gymnast
 4 May – Vasiliki Millousi, artistic gymnast
 10 May – Maria Georgatou, rhythmic gymnast
 23 August – Evmorfia Dona, rhythmic gymnast

References

 
Years of the 20th century in Greece
Greece
1980s in Greece
Greece